NPO Sport (formerly Sport24) was a Dutch sports channel owned by the Nederlandse Publieke Omroep (NPO) and operated by Nederlandse Omroep Stichting (NOS). It launched on 19 July 2009 and time-shared with NPO Politiek en Nieuws when the legislature was not in session.

References

External links 

 Official Website NPO Sport

Television channels in the Netherlands
Television channels and stations established in 2009